Cauchas fibulella is a day-active moth of the Adelidae family. It is known from most of Europe, although there are no records from Portugal, Ireland, Iceland, most of the Balkans, Belarus, southern Russia and the Mediterranean Islands.

The wingspan is 8–8.5 mm for males and 7.9–8.6 for females. The wings are red-brown with a metallic glow. There is a yellow band and yellow spot located on the forewing. Adults are on wing from May to June.

The larvae feed on Veronica chamaedrys and Veronica officinalis. They start feeding on the seeds. Later, they build a portable case from fragments of plant and start feeding on the leaves close to the ground.

External links
microlepidoptera.nl
Lepidoptera of Belgium
UKmoths
Species info

Adelidae
Moths described in 1775
Moths of Europe
Moths of Asia